Floyd Vrtiska (October 12, 1926 – September 15, 2020) was an American politician who served in the Nebraska Legislature from the 1st district from 1993 to 2005.

Background
Vrtiska was born in Table Rock, Nebraska and graduated from Table Rock High School. He was a farmer and raised cattle. Vrtiska served as mayor and fire chief of Table Rock. He also served on the Pawnee County Commission.

Death
He died on September 15, 2020, in Lincoln, Nebraska at age 93.

References

1926 births
2020 deaths
People from Pawnee County, Nebraska
Farmers from Nebraska
Mayors of places in Nebraska
County supervisors and commissioners in Nebraska
Republican Party Nebraska state senators